Psilaster is a genus of sea stars of the family Astropectinidae.

Species  
The World Register of Marine Species lists the following species in the genus: -

 Psilaster acuminatus  Sladen, 1889
 Psilaster agassizi  (Koehler, 1909)
 Psilaster andromeda  (Müller & Troschel, 1842)
 Psilaster armatus  Ludwig, 1905
 Psilaster attenuatus  Fisher, 1906
 Psilaster cassiope  Sladen, 1889
 Psilaster charcoti  (Koehler, 1906)
 Psilaster florae  (Verrill, 1878)
 Psilaster gotoi  Fisher, 1913
 Psilaster herwigi  (Bernasconi, 1972)
 Psilaster pectinatus  (Fisher, 1905)
 Psilaster robustus  Fisher, 1913
 Psilaster sladeni  Ludwig, 1905

References